Meneghello is an Italian surname. Notable people with the surname include:

Ezio Meneghello (1919–1987), Italian footballer
Julio Meneghello (1911–2009), Chilean physician
Luigi Meneghello (1922–2007), Italian writer
Matteo Meneghello (born 1981), Italian racing driver
Virgil Meneghello Dinčić (1876–1944), Croatian painter and art teacher

Italian-language surnames